Claire Rosen (born 1983, New York) is an American fine art photographer. She was included in Forbes magazine's "30 Brightest Under 30" list for 2012 and 2013 in Art & Design.

Work 
Rosen's work often features anthropomorphic animals, archetypal heroines, or symbolic still-lives evoking the aesthetics of classical painting influenced by the Pre-Raphaelites and referencing the Victorian Era. Her work has been displayed internationally and belongs to a number of public and private collections.

Early life

Born in New York in 1983 and raised in New Jersey, Claire Rosen is the eldest daughter of Dolly and Edward Rosen. Her mother is a culinary historian specializing in Victorian-era cake baking, and her father is a banking and intellectual property lawyer who interested Rosen in philosophy and the Socratic method from an early age. She has younger sisters whom she would drape in sheets and pose as Greek goddesses in the family's backyard when they were children. Her mother read to them from Grimm's Fairy Tales, Beatrix Potter, Alice's Adventures in Wonderland, and L. Frank Baum. Rosen was also taken on frequent trips to the zoo, the circus, and the Museum of Natural History, which fostered a love of animals and taxidermy that has carried into her art.

As a youth she was interested in art, but didn't express herself visually until college when she took her first photography class.

Rosen attended Bard College at Simon's Rock, where she tried photography for the first time. She graduated with a liberal arts degree in 2003. She attended Savannah College of Art and Design (SCAD), where she learned technical skills and met Steve Aishman, a physicist-turned-photo instructor who became a mentor to Rosen. She earned her Bachelor of Fine Arts degree in Photography in 2006.

Career

Rockport, Maine

Rosen moved to Maine after graduating from SCAD to complete a three-month internship with Joyce Tenneson at the Maine Media Workshops in Rockport. Following the internship, Rosen remained in Rockport to manage Tenneson's studio for two and a half years. It was there that Rosen began reading the works of Karl Jung, Freud, Joseph Campbell, and Bruno Bettelheim, which have subsequently impacted her work. She met Cig Harvey, who became a role model for Rosen. It was also during this time that Rosen created Fairy Tales and Other Stories, which is a series of self-portraits, and Dolls in the Attic.

New York

In 2009, Rosen moved back to New York and began working independently as a fine artist. She exhibited photos from her two series in juried shows. Fairy Tales received attention, and some images were licensed by magazines to run alongside articles. This marked the beginning of Rosen's crossover into commercial work, whereupon she began creating commissioned images for book covers, clothing designers, and other organizations.  To date, Rosen has created commissioned work for National Geographic Magazine, FujiFilm US, Alex Randall Chandeliers, Neiman Marcus at Short Hills, Smithsonian Magazine, Random House Book, and a number of other businesses and magazines.

The Millbrook Collection

In 2010, Rosen photographed the vintage taxidermy in the collection of the Millbrook School in Dutchess County. She was selected as an artist in residence for the school. The collection contained 10,000 eggs, and approximately 500 taxidermy animals, birds, and reptiles, dating back to the early 20th century. The whole collection encompasses rare and endangered species from all over the world, covering an extraordinary period of time, with pieces dating back to the 1800s. In addition to the exotic, it is an excellent record of local wildlife and hosts examples of birds of prey found and preserved by students on campus. Beyond its impressive numbers, the Millbrook collection has a story to tell. For example, during the renovation of the science building, hundred of boxes and tins were uncovered beneath the floorboards. Each tin contained a bird's nest, wrapped carefully in newspaper from the 1920s and accompanied by a handwritten description of its contents. In addition, beautifully handwritten personal letters and journals from the original collectors were also discovered.

This series documents the history of these pieces, photographing them with their original records when possible and isolating each piece on a black background. The artifacts are precious and beautiful in their own right and the photographs depicting them capture every facial expression and every mark from the passage of time and scar from the taxidermy procedure. By documenting these pieces in isolation, viewers will be able to appreciate the uniqueness of each piece. Together the photographs tell a story that weaves together history, biology the pursuit of knowledge and man's relationship to the natural world and will offer the wider world access to the wonders of this collection. The project will be published as a book in the near future.

Birds of a Feather

Birds of a Feather is Rosen's most widely seen photographic series. Rosen attributes the extremely positive response to the series to its beauty and sense of humor. The images feature portraits of exotic birds against coordinating wallpaper backgrounds. Birds of a Feather offers a new perspective on this tradition with portraits of live birds - from the common Parakeet to the exotic Hyacinth Macaw to the stoic Gyrfalcon - photographed against complementary historical and reproduction wallpaper and fabric from the Victorian Era. As the cult of colonization and exploration spread during the Victorian Era in Europe, it yielded brutal discovery and domination of faraway places, creatures and cultures. As these discoveries made their way back to Europe, aviary collection and display as well as a general fascination with the natural world and its exotic inhabitants rose in fashion. This series references that desire to possess the beautiful, wild and exotic, a possession that permanently changes the object of desire through its dislocation. The backgrounds in this series are selected to induce beauty, optical illusion and visual blending, the birds appear to belong when in reality it is a far cry from their natural environment. The birds mirror the careful, self-conscious poses of humans in an unexpected way. Posed, the birds anthropomorphize as we attribute human emotion and intent to their expressions.

. Rosen explained of the series:
The Industrial Revolution and colonization created this disconnect from nature in the Victorian Era and yielded an awareness of faraway places, amazing creatures, and unfamiliar culture. This series references that desire to possess the beautiful and exotic.

Birds of a Feather was created in 2012. It includes common pets like parakeets, as well as exotics like the Hyacinth Macaw. Rosen discovered Bird Paradise, the "largest exotic bird superstore," in New Jersey while trying to find a toucan to photograph for a commercial project, and was inspired to do a photoshoot with the birds in the store. She created sample images with her own pet parakeets. The photos were set up as portraits with traditional portrait lighting. Rosen brought sheets of wallpaper from Waterhouse Wallhangings to serve as backgrounds for the portraits. Friend Tom Pisano assisted with the photoshoot, handling the birds.

Fantastical Feasts

In 2014, Rosen created a photo series entitled Fantastical Feasts, which features animals eating around banquet tables in compositions that allude to Leonardo da Vinci's The Last Supper. Each photo in the series features a different species—including elephants, tapirs, sloths, miniature ponies, goats, mice, parakeets, honey bees, hedgehogs, etc.—eating the foods it prefers. Ron Haviv, New York photojournalist and owner of VII photo agency, assisted with the project. Rebecca Manson, New York expert retoucher, worked with Rosen on the images.

The banquet is a historically defining characteristic of culture and conjures up vivid and colorful imagery, plentiful food and wine, exotic recipes, lavish presentations and glorious surroundings. The evolution of formal dining begins in the medieval era, where dining became a sign of social status. A change in society had emerged during the era of the Middles Ages when travel, prompted by the Crusades, led to a new and unprecedented interest in beautiful objects and elegant manners. This change extended to food preparation and presentation resulting in epic food arrangements with exotic colors and flavorings. Again, a boom in exploration and colonization in the Victorian Era yielded an interest in the exotic “other”, a fascination which also extended to animals and the natural world. The wealthy began to fill their houses with costly, splendid goods, their table settings became more elaborate, and dining became a pageant in its own right.

This series of whimsical panoramic photographs depict animals reveling around elaborate banquet tables, inspired by Leonardo da Vinci's masterpiece, "The Last Supper” and by Pierre Subleyras classic painting, “The Feast in the House of Simon”. The intricate table spreads are carefully arranged, in the style of Dutch still life paintings of the 17th century. The series features anthropomorphized creatures great and small; from Elephants enjoying piles of peanuts and large stacks of peanut butter sandwiches to Honeybees swarming miniature trays of nectar flowers, and many other creatures winged, hoofed and found under the sea. Some of the animals are exotic, some we see every day. Created during extensive travel with goats from a suburb of Sarajevo in Bosnia, lar gibbons from Thailand, starfish from Norway, bison from Indiana USA, and three toed sloths found along the Amazon River in Peru to name just a few.

The series utilizes the icon of the banquet and "Last Supper" to subtly encourage viewers to consider those in the animal kingdom more humanly affording them more rights and status. To see animals humanely sometimes requires us to see them as human-like. By placing animals in a setting typically reserved for humans, it raises the question of whether we may have more in common than we admit. The feasts invite the viewers to reflect on the nature of society, our relationship and responsibility to the creatures we share the planet with.

Ed Schoenfield, New York restaurateur, commissioned Rosen to photograph a duck feast for his restaurant after seeing the series.

Lectures

Rosen has taught workshops around the world through multiple organizations, including B&H, Gulf Photo Plus, SCAD, and Hallmark Institute. Recently she gave an artist talk at the National Geographic Photography Seminar in Washington DC.

Personal life

At the encouragement of Beth Taubner, creative consultant of Mercurylab, Rosen researched her ancestry and discovered that her maternal grandfather, who died when her mother, Dolly, was sixteen, was a fashion photographer in Hollywood. He photographed female starlets, posing them with animals. Rosen discovered this fact months after taking similar photographs herself.

Photo series
Anthropodia, 2015
Fantastical Feasts, 2014
Nostalgia: a Study In Color, 2013
Birds of a Feather, 2012
Millbrook Collection, 2010
Dolls in the Attic, 2009
Fairy Tales and Other Stories, 2008

Exhibitions
Imaginarium UPI Gallery, Brooklyn, NY, 2017
The Fence: Birds of Prey Photoville Atlanta, Boston, Brooklyn, Houston and Santa Fe, 2017
Identity: The List Portraits, Annenberg Space for Photography, Los Angeles, CA
Birds of a Feather, Indian Photo Festival, Hyderabad, India
Fantastical Feasts, Cede Gallery Booth at Lima Photo, Lima, Peru
Birds of a Feather, Regina Gallery, Seoul, South Korea
The Fence: Arthropodia, Photoville Atlanta, Boston, Brooklyn, Houston and Santa Fe
Pleasing Illusions, Korogram, Seoul, South Korea
Birds of a Feather, SCAD Booth - Hong Kong Art Central, China
Birds of a Feather, GPP Gallery, Dubai, UAE
Birds of a Feather, Summit Public Art, Summit, NJ
Birds of a Feather, Outdoor Lightbox Installation, SCAD Atlanta, GA
Miniature Pony Feast, SCAD Lacoste, France
SCADFASH 300: Nostalgia for Daniel Lismore Exhibit, SCADFASH Museum Atlanta, GA
The Evidence Project, Ciara Struwig, South Africa
Birds of a Feather Center for Photography at Woodstock, Woodstock NY, 2015
Reverie SCAD Museum of Art, Savannah GA, 2013

Awards and features
PDN Photo Annual, 2018
Short List, Communications Arts, 2018
The Fence, Photoville, 2017
Long List, Aesthetica Art Prize, 2016
Selected Photographer, The Fence, Photoville, 2016
Critical Mass Finalist, Photolucinda, 2016
Featured Artist, Der Greif magazine, issue 8, April 2015
Featured Photographer, Communication Arts magazine, Design Annual, Sept/Oct 2015
Selected Photographer, The Fence, Photoville, 2015
Selected Photographer, The Fence, Photoville, 2014
Second Place, Professional Advertising, Prix de la Photographie, 2014
First Place, Pro Still Life, International Photo Awards, 2014
Selected Photographer, The Fence, Photoville, 2013
30 Brightest Under 30 in Art and Style, Forbes Magazine, 2013
30 Brightest Under 30 in Art and Design, Forbes Magazine, 2012
Second Place, Professional Advertising, Prix de la Photographie, 2012
Second Place, Professional Advertising, Prix de la Photographie, 2011
Second Place, Pro Self Portrait, International Photography Awards, 2010
First Place, Fashion Advertising, Prix de la Photographie, 2010
First Place, Self Portraiture, Prix de la Photographie, 2009

References

External links
Official website

Fine art photographers
1983 births
Living people
21st-century American photographers
21st-century American women photographers